The Angel is a British business game show that was broadcast on Sky1 from 24 July to 21 August 2012. It was hosted by Amanda Byram and John Caudwell played the role of "The Angel".

External links

2010s British game shows
2012 British television series debuts
2012 British television series endings
Business-related television series in the United Kingdom
Sky UK original programming
Television series by ITV Studios